Kornell Mark Marshall Winston McDonald (born 1 October 2001) is an English professional footballer who plays as a right-back for Redditch United.

Club career
McDonald made his debut for Derby County as a substitute in a 0–0 draw with Brentford on 9 December 2020. After 8 first team appearances, McDonald was released by the club in July 2022.

On 27 September 2022, McDonald signed for National League North club Kettering Town. On 6 January 2023, he joined Bedford Town before joining Redditch United less than three weeks later.

Career statistics

References

2001 births
Living people
English footballers
Association football defenders
Association football fullbacks
English Football League players
National League (English football) players
Southern Football League players
Derby County F.C. players
Kettering Town F.C. players
Bedford Town F.C. players
Redditch United F.C. players